William Cosyn (fl. 1421–1431) of Totnes, Devon, was an English politician.

He was a Member (MP) of the Parliament of England for Totnes in December 1421, 1423, 1425, 1427, 1429 and 1431.

References

Year of birth missing
Year of death missing
English MPs December 1421
Members of the Parliament of England (pre-1707) for Totnes
English MPs 1423
English MPs 1425
English MPs 1427
English MPs 1429
English MPs 1431